Commonly known as hellebores, the Eurasian genus Helleborus consists of approximately 20 species of herbaceous or evergreen perennial flowering plants in the family Ranunculaceae, within which it gave its name to the tribe of Helleboreae. Despite names such as "winter rose", "Christmas rose" and "Lenten rose", hellebores are not closely related to the rose family (Rosaceae). Many hellebore species are poisonous.

Description 
The flowers have five petal-like sepals surrounding a ring of small, cup-like nectaries which are actually petals modified to hold nectar. The sepals do not fall as petals would, but remain on the plant, sometimes for many months. Recent research in Spain suggests that the persistence of the sepals contributes to the development of the seeds.

Taxonomy 
The genus was established by Carl Linnaeus in volume one of his Species Plantarum in 1753.

It is also possibly from Greek, ἄλκη “fawn”, βιβρώσκω (bibrṓskō, “to eat”).

Species and subspecies 
Twenty-two species are recognised and divided into six sections.
The table below shows the species of the genus Helleborus, give its common name, the area of distribution, an image if available and the meaning of the scientific name. The cladogram shows the relationship between the different species determined with microbiological methods by Meiners et al. (2011).

Caulescent species
These four species have leaves on their flowering stems (in H. vesicarius the stems die back each year; it also has basal leaves).

 Helleborus argutifolius – Corsican hellebore
 Helleborus foetidus – stinking hellebore or setterwort
 Helleborus lividus
 Helleborus vesicarius

Acaulescent (stemless) species
These species have basal leaves. They have no true leaves on their flower stalks (although there are leafy bracts where the flower stalks branch).

 Helleborus atrorubens
 Helleborus croaticus
 Helleborus cyclophyllus
 Helleborus dumetorum
 Helleborus abruzzicus
 Helleborus liguricus
 Helleborus bocconei
 Helleborus multifidus
 Helleborus multifidus subsp. hercegovinus
 Helleborus multifidus subsp. istriacus
 Helleborus multifidus subsp. multifidus
 Helleborus niger – Christmas rose or black hellebore
 Helleborus niger subsp. macranthus (syn. H. niger major)
 Helleborus niger subsp. niger
 Helleborus odorus
 Helleborus odorus subsp. laxus
 Helleborus odorus subsp. odorus
 Helleborus orientalis – Lenten rose, Lenten hellebore, oriental hellebore (N.B. most of the Lenten hellebores in gardens are now considered to be H. × hybridus)
 Helleborus orientalis subsp. abchasicus (syn. H. abchasicus)
 Helleborus orientalis subsp. guttatus
 Helleborus orientalis subsp. orientalis (syn. H. caucasicus, H. kochii)
 Helleborus purpurascens
 Helleborus thibetanus (syn. H. chinensis)
 Helleborus torquatus
 Helleborus viridis - green hellebore or bear's-foot
 Helleborus occidentalis (formerly H. viridis subsp. occidentalis)

Other species names (now considered invalid) may be encountered in older literature, including H. hyemalis, H. polychromus, H. ranunculinus, H. trifolius.

Hellebore hybrids

Hybridising (deliberate and accidental) between H. orientalis and several other closely related species and subspecies has vastly improved the colour-range of the flowers, which now extends from slate grey, near-black, deep purple and plum, through rich red and pinks to yellow, white and green. The outer surface of the sepals is often green-tinged, and as the flower ages it usually becomes greener inside and out; individual flowers often remain on the plant for a month or more. The inner surface of each sepal may be marked with veins, or dotted or blotched with pink, red or purple. "Picotee" flowers, whose pale-coloured sepals have narrow margins of a darker colour, are much sought-after, as are those with dark nectaries which contrast with the outer sepals.

Recent breeding programmes have also created double-flowered and anemone-centred plants. Ironically, doing this is actually reversing the evolutionary process in which hellebores' true petals had been modified into nectaries; it is usually these nectaries which become the extra petals in double, semi-double and anemone-centred flowers. Double-flowered hellebores provide a very interesting variation to the standard hellebore. They are generally easy to maintain and share the same planting conditions as the standard hellebore.

Semi-double flowers have one or two extra rows of petals; doubles have more. Their inner petals are generally very like the outer ones in colour and patterning. They are often of a similar length and shape, though they may be slightly shorter and narrower, and some are attractively waved or ruffled. By contrast, anemone-centred flowers have, cupped within the five normal outer petals, a ring of much shorter, more curved extra petals (sometimes trumpet-shaped, intermediate in appearance between petals and nectaries), which may be a different colour from the outer petals. These short, extra petals (sometimes known as "petaloids") drop off after the flower has been pollinated, leaving an apparently single flower, whereas doubles and semi-doubles tend to retain their extra petals after pollination.

Interspecific hybrids
Gardeners and nurserymen have also created hybrids between less closely related species. The earliest was probably H. × nigercors, a cross between H.  niger and H. argutifolius (formerly H. lividus subsp. corsicus or H. corsicus, hence the name) first made in 1931. H. × sternii, a cross between H. argutifolius and H. lividus, first exhibited in 1947, is named after the celebrated British plantsman Sir Frederick Stern. H. × ballardiae (H. niger crossed with H. lividus) and H. × ericsmithii (H. niger crossed with H. × sternii) similarly commemorate the noted British nursery owners Helen Ballard and Eric Smith. In recent years, Ashwood Nurseries (of Kingswinford in the English Midlands), already well known for its Ashwood Garden Hybrids (H. × hybridus singles, semi-doubles, doubles and anemone-centres), has created hybrids between H. niger and H. thibetanus (called H. 'Pink Ice'), and between H. niger and H. vesicarius (called H. 'Briar Rose'). The gardenworthiness of these hybrids has still to be proven.

The following hellebore species and cultivars have gained the Royal Horticultural Society's Award of Garden Merit:

 H. argutifolius
 H. foetidus
 H. lividus
 H. niger
 H. × sternii 'Blackthorn Group'

Distribution

Various species of this genus originated in Europe and Asia. The greatest concentration of species occurs in the Balkans. One atypical species (H. thibetanus) comes from western China; another atypical species (H. vesicarius) inhabits a small area on the border between Turkey and Syria.

Pests and diseases

Insects

Phytomyza hellebori
More commonly known as the Hellebore leaf miner, Phytomyza hellebori is a small fly that infests only the H. foetidus plants in the Hellebore family. The leaf miner fly digs tunnels into the leaves of the H. foetidus. The tunnels create brownish-black blotches on the plant. These later turn into a nesting ground where the flies lay their eggs. With time, the leaves turn a brownish-white along where the tunnels were dug. The larvae start to eat the inside of the leaves in August, and damage develops from the late summer to the early spring, with heavy attacks leaving the foliage disfigured by spring.

To control heavy infestations, the leaves can be removed and destroyed during the winter months before the adult flies emerge. Insecticides can be used with limited effectiveness in controlling larvae and fly populations in the plant. Insecticides may harm non-leaf miner flies if applied during the hellebore's flowering period.

Macrosiphum hellebori
Macrosiphum hellebori, commonly known as 'Hellebore aphid' or 'greenfly', is a sap-feeding aphid that infests the flowers and foliage of hellebore plants. This species of aphid only affects hellebores and is most active in March and April when the hellebores are flowering and when few aphid predators are around, though they may infest during any time of the year.

Aphids start their feeding from the outside the flowers, beginning at the leaves and then moving towards the flower petals of the hellebore. As the hellebore beings to open, the aphids try to move into the flower. The aphids then feed on the inner parts of the plant as well as the young stems and shoots. As the population grows, the aphids eventually eat the remaining parts of the plant, such as older leaves, for food.

Aphid infestations can be controlled through persistent squashing of the aphids manually or by using insecticides. It is not recommended to spray flowering hellebores as it may harm the non-aphid pollinating insects.

Diseases

Botrytis cinerea 
Botrytis cinerea or grey mold is a fungal disease that infects most ornamental plants. The fungus causes a decay of plant tissues and grows fuzzy gray-brown mold over the decaying areas, such as the buds, leaves, and flowers. Parts of the plant may shrivel and die after exposure to the mold, particularly the flowers. Typically the fungus infects plants only through an open wound or when the plant is under stress, but it has also been known to infect plants in humid conditions. If the humidity is low, the mold may be contained to discrete spots on the plant, but the mold has been known to spread rapidly in highly humid conditions. Grey mold is not seasonally dependent and can infect a plant at any time of the year. The fungus forms black seed-like structures in the dead plant tissue to create its spores to help it survive when new host plants are scarce. The spores are spread through the air to new plants.

To treat the infected plant, the first step is to remove infected and dying leaves, buds, and flowers immediately along with any other dead plant materials around the hellebore. The next step is to reduce the humidity around the plant by improving the ventilation and ensuring the plants are not overcrowded.

Coniothyrium hellebori 
Coniothyrium hellebori is a fungus that causes the most common fungal disease for helleborus species known as Hellebore black spot or leaf spot. The disease is most common not only in botanical and ornamental gardens but also in hellebore nurseries as well. Visible symptoms include blackish-brown spots that often appear as rings on the leaf blade or at the margins of the leaf. The spots continue to grow larger as the disease progresses, retaining an elliptical or circular shape and turning a dark brown or black color. The spots grow until they infect the whole leaf. Petioles and flowers can also be infected, but the disease is primarily seen in the leaves. The symptoms become visible in the spring and worsen with time.

The small black fruiting bodies which carry the spores, pycnidia, are formed in the dead cells of the leaf spots. The spores are mainly spread by water, wind, and wind-blown rain. The fungus has an ideal habitat to spread and grow at the final growth site for hellebore plants, and if left untreated, the spores remain for many years. The most effective method against C. hellebori is to remove and destroy the infected leaves immediately to avoid reinfection the following spring.

Helleborus net necrosis virus 
Helleborus net necrosis virus (HeNNV), also known as Hellebore black death, is an RNA virus that can cause serious disease in Hellebore plants by stunting or deforming the plant as it grows. The disease marks the leaves of the hellebores with black streaks, often following the veins of the leaf, and creating ring patterns. It can also mark the sepals and flowers with black spots or streaks but does not always do so. When symptoms are severe, new leaves have limited growth before dying off. The most seriously affected in the UK is H. orientalis, but all hellebores are susceptible to the disease. The most effective method of treatment against black death is to dig up and destroy all infected plants immediately. Many viruses are not transmitted through seeds, so it is possible to raise new disease resistant plants this way.

Pseudomonas viridiflava 
Pseudomonas viridiflava is a bacterium that has been claimed to cause disease in hellebores in New Zealand, among other plants. The bacterial disease manifested on hellebore plants in the form of black leaf spots, necrosis petal, and stem lesions. The most popular ornamental and commercial crop grown in New Zealand is H. orientalis and its hybrids, of which 90 percent of the H. orientalis in the Tauranga nursery contracted the disease after several days of moderate rainfall. The disease caused discoloration in the form of black leaf spots that were circular and about 1.5–2 mm in diameter, black stem lesions, and dry, grey to brown lesions with distinct margins on the flower petals. The symptoms were different from other leaf-spotting hellebore diseases, such as those caused by the fungus Coniothyrium and the bacteria Xanthomonas The case in New Zealand is the only reported case of P. viridiflava infecting hellebores so far, but in other plants P. viridiflava has been reported to also induce symptoms such as leaf rot, leaf blotch, stem necrosis and blossom blight.

Horticulture

Hellebores are widely grown in United States Department of Agriculture hardiness zones 5a to 8b gardens for decorative purposes. They are particularly valued by gardeners for their winter and early spring flowering period; the plants are surprisingly frost-resistant and many are evergreen. Also of value is their shade tolerance. Many species of hellebore have green or greenish-purple flowers and are of limited garden value, although Corsican hellebore (H. argutifolius), a robust plant with pale green, cup-shaped flowers and attractive leathery foliage, is widely grown. So is the 'stinking hellebore' or setterwort (H. foetidus), which has drooping clusters of small, pale green, bell-shaped flowers, often edged with maroon, which contrasts with its dark evergreen foliage. H. foetidus 'Wester Flisk', with red-flushed flowers and flower stalks, is becoming popular, as are more recent selections with golden-yellow foliage.

The so-called Christmas rose (H. niger), a traditional cottage garden favourite, bears its pure white flowers (which often age to pink) in the depths of winter; large-flowered cultivars are available, as are pink-flowered and double-flowered selections.

The most popular hellebores for garden use are H. orientalis and its colourful hybrids, H. × hybridus (Lenten rose).. In the northern hemisphere, they flower in early spring, around the period of Lent, and are often known as Lenten hellebores, oriental hellebores, or Lenten roses. They are excellent for bringing early colour to shady herbaceous borders and areas between deciduous shrubs and under trees.

The cultivar ='Walhero' (sometimes listed under H. × hybridus) has won the Royal Horticultural Society's Award of Garden Merit.

Toxicity 

All helleborus plants are toxic, and all parts of the helleborus plant are toxic. Hellebore poisoning is rare, but it does occur.
Hellebore plants are usually left alone by animals such as deer and rabbits because the leaves of the plant produce poisonous alkaloids, making them distasteful to animals. The poisonous alkaloids have been known to sometimes bother gardeners with sensitive skin. It was used in the First Sacred War at the start of the sixth century BC to poison the water supply of the city of Kirrha.

Poisonings occur through ingestion or handling. Hellebore plants should not be ingested as poisoning cases are most severe when the plants are eaten. This is especially true when hellebores are eaten in large quantities. Symptoms of ingestion include: burning of the mouth and throat, salivation, vomiting, abdominal cramping, diarrhea, nervous symptoms, and possibly depression. Consuming large quantities of hellebore plants can be fatal. Toxic cardiac glycosides occur in the roots. High levels of ranunculin and protoanemonin, especially in the leaves and sap, also contribute to symptoms after ingestion.

Dermatitis may also occur from handling the hellebore plants without protection. This is typically caused by the ranunculin and protoanemonin found on the outside of the plant, including the leaves, stem, flower, and sap. The poison on the outside of the plant causes irritation and burning sensations on the skin. When collecting seeds from hellebore plants, it is recommended to wait for the pods to dry and shake them out into a container or onto the ground to collect. Attempts to remove the seeds by hand exposes skin to the potent toxins in the sap of the hellebore, which can increase the damage done to the skin. Small or minimal exposure to the toxins should only cause a mild irritation to the skin, and the affliction should only last for a few minutes. If the burning persists or intensifies, it is recommended to wash the affected areas thoroughly to remove the toxins and see a doctor.

The species historically known as "Black hellebore" cause tinnitus, vertigo, stupor, thirst, anaphylaxis, emesis (vomiting), catharsis, bradycardia (slowing of the heart rate), and finally, collapse and death from cardiac arrest. Although Helleborus niger (black hellebore) contains protoanemonin or ranunculin, which has an acrid taste and can cause burning of the eyes, mouth, and throat, oral ulceration, gastroenteritis, and hematemesis, research in the 1970s showed that the roots of H. niger do not contain the cardiotoxic compounds helleborin, hellebrin, and helleborein that are responsible for the lethal reputation of "black hellebore". It seems that earlier studies may have used a commercial preparation containing a mixture of material from other species such as Helleborus viridis, green hellebore.

Uses 
In the early days of medicine, two kinds of hellebore were recognized: black hellebore, which included various species of Helleborus, and white hellebore, now known as Veratrum album, which belongs to a different plant family, the Melanthiaceae. Although the latter plant is highly toxic, containing veratrine and the teratogens cyclopamine (which can cause the fatal birth defect of cyclopia) and jervine, it is believed to be the "hellebore" used by Hippocrates as a purgative.

Despite its toxicity, "black hellebore" was used by the Greek and Romans to treat paralysis, gout and other diseases, more particularly insanity.

Culture
H. niger is commonly called the Christmas rose, due to an old legend that it sprouted in the snow from the tears of a young girl who had no gift to give the Christ Child in Bethlehem.

In Greek mythology, Melampus of Pylos used hellebore to save the daughters of the king of Argos from a madness, induced by Dionysus, that caused them to run naked through the city, crying, weeping, and screaming. 

During the Siege of Kirrha in 585 BC, hellebore was reportedly used by the Greek besiegers to poison the city's water supply.  The defenders were subsequently so weakened by diarrhea that they were unable to defend the city from assault.

In a fit of madness induced by Hera, Heracles killed his children by Megara. His madness was cured using hellebore.

Gallery

Species

Hybrids

See also 
 Christmas flowers
 Veratrum

References

 
 Orphan reference: Graham Rice & Elizabeth Strangman, The Gardener's Guide to Growing Hellebores, David & Charles/Timber Press (1993) 
 Orphan reference: Brian Mathew, Hellebores, Alpine Garden Society (1989)

External links

 A French hellebore enthusiast's non-commercial site
 The  National Collection of Hellebore species and hybrids, Hazles Cross Farm Nursery (Staffordshire, UK) contains all known species plus hundreds of garden hybrids
Flora Europaea: Helleborus
 Hellebores.org: A comprehensive online resource on the genus Helleborus 
 National collection of Hellebores
 RHS plant pathology report on 'Hellebore Black Death' disease (pdf)
 Growing Guide

 
Christmas plants
Garden plants
Ranunculaceae genera
Abortifacients